Norman Cobb "Kitty" Brashear (August 27, 1877 – December 22, 1934) was a pitcher in Major League Baseball for the 1899 Louisville Colonels. 

He played in the minor leagues through 1915. His brother, Roy Brashear, also played Major League baseball.

External links

1877 births
1934 deaths
Major League Baseball pitchers
Louisville Colonels players
19th-century baseball players
Baseball players from Ohio
Minor league baseball managers
Fort Wayne Indians players
Cedar Rapids Bunnies players
Colorado Springs Millionaires players
Kansas City Blues (baseball) players
St. Joseph Saints players
Oakland Oaks (baseball) players
Seattle Siwashes players
Los Angeles Angels (minor league) players
Altoona Mountaineers players
Johnstown Johnnies players
Vernon Tigers players
Vancouver Beavers players
San Bernardino Kittens players
Tucson Old Pueblos players